Allium galileum is a species of onion known only from Palestine and Israel.

Allium galileum has egg-shaped bulbs up to 22 mm long. Scape is rigid, up to 50 cm tall. Leaves are tubular, up to 25 cm long. Umbel is lax, with many flowers. Tepals are yellow-green or purple-green.

References

galileum
Onions
Flora of Palestine (region)
Plants described in 2008